Vrazhdebna Air Base, Sofia
 Graf Ignatievo Air Base, Plovdiv region
 Krumovo Air Base, Plovdiv region
 Bezmer Air Base, Yambol region
 Nebneb Air Base, Burgas region
 Dolna Mitropoliya Air Base, Pleven region
 Varna Naval Base, Varna
 Atiya Naval Base, Burgas region
 Chayka Naval Air Base, Varna
 Novo Selo Range in Sliven region
 Aytos Logistics Center in Burgas region

See also
 Lists of military installations

External links
 Bulgarian Air Force

Bases
bases
Bulgarian